Selby Township is one of twenty-five townships in Bureau County, Illinois, USA. As of the 2020 census, its population was 2,152 and it contained 929 housing units.

Geography

Villages
 DePue (northwest three-quarters)
 Hollowayville
 Seatonville (west quarter)

Unincorporated towns
 Coal Hollow

Cemeteries
The township contains six cemeteries:

 Artestian Well
 DePue Village
 Evangelical and Reformed
 Hollowayville
 Saint Johns Lutheran
 Searl Ridge

Major highways
  Interstate 80
  I-180
  U.S. Route 6
  Illinois Route 29

Airports and landing strips
 Foley Airport

Landmarks
 Lake Park
 White City Park

Demographics
As of the 2020 census there were 2,152 people, 808 households, and 640 families residing in the township. The racial makeup of the township was 55.95% White, 1.35% African American, 2.09% Native American, 2.60% Asian, 0.05% Pacific Islander, 18.31% from other races, and 19.66% from two or more races. Hispanic or Latino of any race were 47.58% of the population.

There were 808 households, out of which 36.50% had children under the age of 18 living with them, 59.90% were married couples living together, 10.40% had a female householder with no spouse present, and 20.79% were non-families. 16.70% of all households were made up of individuals, and 9.40% had someone living alone who was 65 years of age or older. The average household size was 2.89 and the average family size was 3.13.

The township's age distribution consisted of 26.9% under the age of 18, 7.2% from 18 to 24, 23.1% from 25 to 44, 25.6% from 45 to 64, and 17.2% who were 65 years of age or older. The median age was 39.4 years. For every 100 females, there were 121.5 males. For every 100 females age 18 and over, there were 130.5 males.

The median income for a household in the township was $62,500, and the median income for a family was $68,056. Males had a median income of $34,697 versus $25,286 for females. The per capita income for the township was $26,589. About 6.9% of families and 11.5% of the population were below the poverty line, including 20.5% of those under age 18 and 4.5% of those age 65 or over.

School districts
 Depue Community Unit School District 103

Political districts
 Illinois's 11th congressional district
 State House District 76
 State Senate District 38

References
 
 US Census Bureau 2007 TIGER/Line Shapefiles
 US National Atlas

External links
 City-Data.com
 Illinois State Archives

Townships in Bureau County, Illinois
Populated places established in 1849
Townships in Illinois
1849 establishments in Illinois